Leonid Kuzmin is a Belarusian pianist.

He won the Belarusian State Competition and the Prague Competition before settling in the United States in the 1980s. He subsequently shared the 1991 Liszt-Bartók Competition's 2nd prize with Midori Nohara.

References
  Alice Tully Hall review - December 1, 1985. Tim Page, New York Times
  Hungarian music competitions palmares
  National Autonomous University of Mexico
  Industrial University of Santander
  La Nación
  El Mercurio
  Instituto Cervantes

External links
 Performance of Camille Saint-Saëns's 2nd Piano Concerto

Belarusian classical pianists
Living people
21st-century classical pianists
Year of birth missing (living people)